Kushwaha (sometimes, Kushvaha) is a community of the Indo-Gangetic Plain which has traditionally been involved in agriculture (including beekeeping). The term has been used to represent different subcastes, being those of the Kachhis, Koeris and Muraos. Under the Indian governments system of positive discrimination, the Kushwahas are classified as a "Backward" or "Other Backward class". From the 20th century onwards, they began to claim descent from the Suryavansh (Solar) dynasty via Kusha, who was one of the twin sons of Rama and Sita. Previously, they had worshipped Shiva and Shakta.

Origin 
The Kushwaha claim descent from the Suryavansh dynasty through Kusha, a son of the mythological Rama, an avatar of Vishnu, a myth of origin developed in the twentieth century. Prior to that time, the various branches that form the Kushwaha community - the Kachhis, Koeris, and Muraos - favoured a connection with Shiva and Shakta. Ganga Prasad Gupta, a proponent of Kushwaha sanskritization, claimed in the 1920s that Kushwaha families worshiped Hanuman - described by Pinch as "the embodiment of true devotion to Ram and Sita" - during Kartika, a month in the Hindu lunar calendar.

Distribution and socio-economic status

William Pinch notes a Kushwaha presence in Uttar Pradesh and Bihar, and they are also recorded in Haryana. Outside India, they are found in the Terai of Nepal, where they have variously been officially recorded as Kushwaha and as Koiri. They also have significant presence among Bihari diaspora in Mauritius. The  migration of Biharis to neighbouring countries was a phenomenon which became more pronounced in the post independence India. Thus, small island nations like Mauritius has significant population of people of Indian origin. The tradition and culture of Hindu migrants in countries like Mauritius is quite different from Indian subcontinent. This is so with varna status and "social hierarchy" as both these terms have several variation in Mauritius vis a vis India. The traditional ruling elites like Rajputs and Brahmins are politically and economically marginalised on the island while cultivating castes like Koeri, Ahir, Kurmi, Kahar and others have improved their social and financial position. According to Crispin Bates:

They are often associated with the Kurmi caste, which have same socio-economic status in the state of Bihar. But, despite having some similarities, both are different in many aspects. In early decades of 20th century, socio-economic ascendancy of the Kurmis led them to join the ranks of landlords. Consequently, they were involved in the formation of a private army called the Bhumi Sena, which was known for perpetrating massacres of the Dalits and other atrocities. In contrast, the Koeris have always remained at the forefront in the battle of weaker sections against the landlords. In some of the districts like Aurangabad district of Bihar, where the feudal system was prevalent, they, along with Yadavs, have successfully led the Dalit masses in their armed struggle against the landlords.

According to a report of Institute of Human Development and Studies, Kushwahas with the per capita income of 18,811 are among the highest earning social groups of Bihar, much above the other important backward castes like Yadavs. They are however placed below the upper castes in per capita earning.. In regions like Samastipur district of Bihar, where they are politically strong, they are found to be notorious for their criminal affairs.

In Uttar Pradesh
In Uttar Pradesh, the community is approximately 8.5% of the total population of the state. They are distributed across the state and are known as Maurya, Morao,  Shakya, Koeri, Kachhi, and Saini in different parts of the state.

Economy
According to Arun Sinha, the Koeris were known for their market gardening activities. Since Indian independence, the land reform movement was making it difficult for the erstwhile upper-caste landlords to maintain their existing holdings. The growing pressure from left-wing militants backed by CPI(ML) and some local political parties, as well as the weakening of the Zamindari system was making it difficult for them to survive in the rural areas. Hence, the decades following independence were marked by the urbanization of upper castes. Their migration to cities was accompanied by selling off of their unproductive holdings, which were mostly bought by the peasants of cultivating middle castes, who were financially sound enough to purchase land. Some of the land was also bought from Muslim families who were migrating to Pakistan. The Koeris, along with Kurmis and Yadavs were the main buyers of these lands.

However, since the peasant castes considered their land to be their most productive asset, they rarely sold it. The zeal of peasant castes to buy more and more land gradually changed their economic profile, and some of them became 'neo-landlords'. This transformation caused them to attempt to protect their new economic status from those below them, especially the Dalits, who were still mainly landless labourers. Thus they adopted many of the practices of their erstwhile landlords. The pattern of land reform in states like Bihar which mainly benefitted the middle castes like those of Koeris was also responsible for the imperfect mobilisation of backward castes in the politics. The  space carved by backwards in electoral politics after 1967 was dominated  mainly by these middle peasant castes and they were the biggest beneficiary of the politics of socialism, the proponent of which were people like Ram Manohar Lohia. The unequitable political space at the disposal of other Backward Castes and Scheduled Castes was thus an implicit implication of these land reforms as according to Varinder Grover:

The differences between upper backward castes and the extremely backward castes and Dalits due to unequal distribution of the benefits of land reforms was thus a major challenge before the CPI(ML) in mobilisation of collective force of lower castes against the upper caste landlords. The upper backward castes like Koeri  were initially less attached  to the CPI(ML) due to their economic progress and the communists were successful in mobilising them only in some regions like Patna, Bhojpur, Aurangabad and Rohtas district. These success were attributed to the widespread dacoity and oppressive attitude of the upper caste landlords faced by these hardworking caste groups which propelled them to join the fold of revolutionary organisations.

Political presence
The Kushwaha also engaged in political action during these latter days of the Raj. Around 1933–1934, the Koeris joined with the Kurmis and Yadavs to form the Triveni Sangh, a caste federation that by 1936 claimed to have a million supporters. This coalition followed an alliance for the 1930 local elections which fared badly at the polls. The new grouping had little electoral success: it won a few seats in the 1937 elections but was stymied by a two-pronged opposition which saw the rival Congress wooing some of its more wealthy leading lights to a newly formed unit called the "Backward Class Federation" and an effective opposition from upper castes organised to keep the lower castes in their customary place. Added to this, the three putatively allied castes were unable to set aside their communal rivalries and the Triveni Sangh also faced competition from the All India Kisan Sabha, a peasant-oriented socio-political campaigning group run by the Communists. The appeal of the Triveni Sangh had waned significantly by 1947 but had achieved a measure of success away from the ballot box, notably by exerting sufficient influence to bring an end to the begar system of forced unpaid labour and by providing a platform for those voices seeking reservation of jobs in government for people who were not upper castes. Many years later, in 1965, there was an abortive attempt to revive the defunct federation.

The Kisan Sabha was dominated by peasant castes like the Koeri, Kurmi and Yadav, which led some historians such as Gyan Pandey to term them mainly movements of the middle peasant castes who organized against bedakhil (eviction), with limited participation of other communities. The reality, however, was more complex. Dalit communities like the Chamars and Pasis, whose traditional occupations were leatherwork and toddy-tapping respectively, formed a significant portion of the landless peasantry and were thus significant in the Kisan Sabha, and present were even members of the high castes such as Brahmins.

The Koeris also had significant presence in the Naxalite movement of 1960's rural Bihar, particularly in Bhojpur and nearby areas like Arrah, where an economic system dominated by the upper caste landlords was still in place. Here, the Communist upsurge against the prevalent feudal system was led by Jagdish Mahto, a Koeri teacher who had read Ambedkar and Marx and was sympathetic to the cause of Dalits.

Mahto organised his militia under the banner of Communist Party of India (Marxist–Leninist), which assassinated many upper-caste landlords in the region . These violent clashes demarcated the dividing lines between Koeris and Bhumihars in the Ekwaari.

For much of the 20th century, the Koeries were generally less politically effective, even less involved, than the Kurmis and Yadavs who broadly shared their socio-economic position in Hindu society. The latter two groups were more vociferous in their actions, including involvement in caste rioting, whilst the Koeris had only a brief prominence during the ascendancy of Jagdeo Prasad. This muted position changed dramatically in the 1990s when the rise to power of Lalu Prasad in Bihar caused an assertion of Yadav-centric policies that demanded a loud reaction.

Earlier, the Koeris were given fair representation in Laloo Yadav as well as Rabri Devi regime. The backward politics unleashed by Laloo Prasad resulted in rise to political prominence of numerous backward castes, among which Koeri were prominent. In this period, caste remained the most effective tool of political mobilisation and even leaders who were theoretically against caste-based politics also appealed to caste loyalties to secure their victory. The Rabri Devi government had appointed ten Koeris as minister in her cabinet, which was sought by many community leaders as a fair representation to the caste.
The portrayal of  Laloo Yadav as a "Messiah of backward castes" lost the ground when the Yadav ascendancy in politics led other aspirational backward castes to move away from his party. In the meantime during 1990s, Nitish Kumar, who was projected as the leader of Kurmi and Koeri communities formed the Samta Party, leading to the isolation of Koeri-Kurmi community from Yadavs and Laloo Prasad.

Thus, the decades following independence witnessed  a complete shift of power from upper castes to the "upper backward castes": a term coined to describe castes like the Koeri, Yadav, Kurmi and Bania in  Bihar. The transfer of power was also witnessed at the local level of governance. The upper caste were first to acquire education and they benefitted from it initially but with the expansion in electoral franchise and growth of "party system",  they lost the ground to upper backward communities. Nepotism and patronage for fellow caste members in government, which had previously been an upper-caste phenomenon, was now available to the upper backward communities. This phenomenon continued with the premiership of Karpoori Thakur in the 1970s, who had provided 12% reservation to lower backward castes and 8% to upper backwards in which Koeri were included. The peak of this patronage was reached during the tenure of Laloo Yadav.

From 1990 onwards the solidarity of backward castes was severely weakened due to division among the Koeri-Kurmi community and Yadavs. The former's voting pattern was in quite contrast to that of the latter. When Samta Party allied with the Bhartiya Janata Party, Koeris voted for this alliance and thus in 1996 Lok Sabha elections BJP fared well, primarily with the support of Koeri and Kurmis. The division among backwards also costed their representation in the assemblies. It was seen that profile of Bihar legislative assembly was changing rapidly since 1967 and till 1995-96 the representation of upper caste was reduced to as lower as 17%. But, the division among backwards served as a hope to the upper castes to at least increase their representation. The success of BJP-Samta coalition however also consolidated the Koeris and the Kurmis, who now emerged as political force in 1996 elections.

Since 1996 the Koeris voted en masse for the JD (U) and BJP coalition. The caste based polarisation in states like Bihar drifted the dominant backward castes away from the Rashtriya Janata Dal and distributed their votes to various political parties. The Koeris who constituted one of the most populous caste group were shifted first towards JD (U)-BJP coalition. Later after the expulsion of Upendra Kushwaha from the JD (U) and formation of Rashtriya Lok Samata Party, their votes were distributed amongst the JD (U) on the one hand and the new social coalition made by BJP with Lok Janshakti Party and Rashtriya Lok Samata Party on the other hand.
In 2015 Bihar Legislative Assembly elections the Janata Dal (United) allied with its rival Rashtriya Janata Dal due to differences with Bhartiya Janata Party. The social composition of these parties and the core voter base are such that this coalition drew immense support from the Yadav, Kurmi and  Kushwaha caste who hardly voted together after the 1990s. Consequently, the coalition emerged with massive victory with the number of legislators from these agrarian castes reaching higher as compared to previous elections.  Later the coalition was ripped apart and in 2020 Assembly elections the disunity among the three castes and split of votes led to huge decline in number of Kushwaha legislators.

Though generally considered as the supporters of Janata Dal (United) in Bihar, the Kushwaha community in some of the left dominated assembly constituencies like Ziradei Assembly constituency and Bibhutipur Assembly constituency are also the core supporters of the Communist parties— Communist Party of India (Marxist) and Communist Party of India (Marxist-Leninist) Liberation. One of the primary reasons behind this is the creation of the rooted leaders like Ramdeo Verma and Amarjeet Kushwaha from the community by these parties.

Culture and beliefs

In the central Bihar backward castes like Koeri are numerically and politically powerful and hence they reject the traditional Jajmani system which relies upon Brahmanical notion of purity and pollution.   The backward caste groups in this region thus do not avail the services of Brahmin priests to perform their rituals. In most of the cases, Koeri households employ a Koeri priest to perform their rituals and their services are also availed by other backward castes like Yadav. These priest who belong to Koeri caste are different from the Brahmin priests in their approval of widow remarriage. They also promote non-vegetarianism  and do not grow tuft like the Brahmins. The tika (liquid form of sandalwood on the head) which is made by the Brahmin priests on their forehead is also disapproved by them.

Classification

Disputed varna status
The Kushwaha were traditionally a peasant community and considered to be of the Shudra varna. Pinch describes them as "skilled agriculturalists". The traditional perception of Shudra status was increasingly challenged during the later decades of British Raj rule, although various castes had made claims of a higher status well before the British administration instituted its first census. The Kurmi community of cultivators, described by Christophe Jaffrelot as "middle caste peasants", led this charge in search of greater respectability.  Pinch describes that "The concern with personal dignity, community identity, and caste status reached a peak among Kurmi, Yadav, and Kushvaha peasants in the first four decades of the twentieth century."

Identification as Kushwaha Kshatriya
From around 1910, the Kachhis and the Koeris, both of whom for much of the preceding century had close links with the British as a consequence of their favoured role in the cultivation of the opium poppy, began to identify themselves as Kushwaha Kshatriya. An organisation claiming to represent those two groups and the Muraos petitioned for official recognition as being of the Kshatriya varna in 1928.

This action by the All India Kushwaha Kshatriya Mahasabha (AIKKM) reflected the general trend for social upliftment by communities that had traditionally been classified as being Shudra. The process, which M. N. Srinivas called sanskritisation, was a feature of late nineteenth- and early twentieth-century caste politics.

The position of the AIKKM was based on the concept of Vaishnavism, which promoted the worship and claims of descent from Rama or Krishna as a means to assume the trappings of Kshatriya symbolism and thus permit the wearing of the sacred thread even though the physical labour inherent in their cultivator occupations intrinsically defined them as Shudra. The movement caused them to abandon their claims to be descended from Shiva in favour of the alternate myth that claimed descent from Rama. In 1921, Ganga Prasad Gupta, a proponent of Kushwaha Sanskritization, had published a book offering proof of the Kshatriya status of the Koeri, Kachhi, Murao and Kachwaha. His reconstructed history argued that the Kushwaha were Hindu descendants of Kush and that in the twelfth century they had served Raja Jaichand in a military capacity during the period of Muslim consolidation of the Delhi Sultanate. Subsequent persecution by the victorious Muslims caused the Kushwaha to disperse and disguise their identity, foregoing the sacred thread and thereby becoming degraded and taking on various localised community names. Gupta's attempt to prove Kshatriya status, in common with similar attempts by others to establish histories of various castes, was spread via the caste associations, which Dipankar Gupta describes as providing a link between the "urban, politically literate elite" members of a caste and the "less literate villagers". Some communities also constructed temples in support of these claims as, for example, did the Muraos in Ayodhya.

Some Kushwaha reformers also argued, in a similar vein to Kurmi reformer Devi Prasad Sinha Chaudhari, that since Rajputs, Bhumihars and Brahmins worked the fields in some areas, there was no rational basis for assertions that such labour marked a community as being of the Shudra varna.

William Pinch describes the growth of militancy among agricultural castes in the wake of their claims to Kshatriya status. Castes like Koeris, Kurmis and Yadavs asserted their Kshatriya status not merely by words but they joined the British Indian Army as soldiers in large number. The growing militancy among them  turned rural Bihar into an arena of conflict in which numerous caste-based militias surfaced and atrocities against the Dalits became the new norm. The militias founded during this period were named after folk figures or popular personalities who were revered by the whole community.

Classification as Backward Caste

Kushwahas are classified as a Other Backward Caste (OBC) in some of the states of India. In 2013, the Haryana government added the Kushwaha, Koeri and Maurya castes to the list of backward classes. In Bihar they are categorized as Other Backward Class. The various subcastes of Kushwaha community viz Kachhi, Shakya and Koeri are categorized as OBC in Uttar Pradesh also.

References 
Notes

Citations

Further reading

Agricultural castes
Shaktism
Social groups of Bihar
Social groups of Uttar Pradesh
Suryavansha
Vaishnavism